Dinochelus ausubeli is a small deep sea lobster discovered in 2007 in the Philippines during the Census of Marine Life and described in 2010 in the new genus Dinochelus. Its two claws are very different in size, are elongated, and bear many long teeth on the inner surface.

Description
Its two claws are very different in size.

Distribution and discovery
D. ausubeli is only known from its type locality, off the coast of Luzon in the Philippines. It was described in 2010 by an international team of scientists.

Taxonomy
The specific epithet "ausubeli" honours Jesse H. Ausubel, the sponsor of the Census of Marine Life, "in recognition of his vision and support for marine biodiversity exploration".

Dinochelus belongs to a group of lobsters previously recognised as the separate family, Thaumastochelidae, which also includes the genera Thaumastocheles and Thaumastochelopsis. These genera all show very long, toothed claws with a bulbous base, with one claw much longer than the other. Dinochelus has features in common with each of those genera; on the basis of DNA sequencing using cytochrome oxidase I, Dinochelus is thought to be the sister taxon to Thaumostocheles + Thaumastochelopsis. It is distinguished from either genus by the unusual, T-shaped form of the epistome.

References

True lobsters
Monotypic arthropod genera
Taxa named by Shane T. Ahyong
Crustaceans described in 2010